Perpetuity is an outdoor 1970 sculpture by Alexander von Svoboda, located in Portland, Oregon.

Description and history

Perpetuity is a sculpture by Alexander von Svoboda, completed in 1970. The seedling is suspended by bronze shafts that pierce the wood and extend several feet beyond, creating a "sunburst" effect. The sculpture measures approximately  x  x , has a  diameter, and weighs 13.5 tons. It rests on a concrete base which measures approximately  x  x . The Smithsonian Institution categorizes the piece as abstract and allegorical ("time", "eternity").

According to Svoboda, the work symbolizes "growth, regeneration and the perpetual cycle of life". Smithsonian offers the following remark by Svoboda: "This is perpetual, the beginning and end of life, or to say it another way, there is no end and no beginning..." The sculpture was surveyed and considered "treatment urgent" by Smithsonian's "Save Outdoor Sculpture!" program in 1993. By then, the sculpture was owned by the World Forestry Center and installed in front of its Merlo Hall, having been donated by Standard Insurance Company.

See also
 1970 in art
 The Quest (1970) by Svoboda, installed in front of Portland's Standard Insurance Center

References

1970 establishments in Oregon
1970 sculptures
Abstract sculptures in Oregon
Allegorical sculptures in Oregon
Bronze sculptures in Oregon
Outdoor sculptures in Portland, Oregon
Sequoioideae
Washington Park (Portland, Oregon)
Wooden sculptures in Oregon